The 1995–96 Auburn Tigers men's basketball team represented Auburn University in the 1995–96 college basketball season. The team's head coach was Cliff Ellis, who was in his second season at Auburn. The team played their home games at Beard–Eaves–Memorial Coliseum in Auburn, Alabama. They finished the season 19–13, 6–10 in SEC play. They defeated Vanderbilt to advance to the quarterfinals of the SEC tournament where they lost to Mississippi State. They received an invitation to the National Invitation Tournament, where they lost to Tulane in the first round.

References

Auburn Tigers men's basketball seasons
Auburn
Auburn
Auburn
Auburn